The 61st Infantry Brigade was an infantry brigade of the British Army raised for active service in both the First and the Second World Wars.

History

First World War
The brigade was raised in September 1914 during the First World War from men volunteering for Lord Kitchener's New Armies, originally as the 61st Brigade, as part of Kitchener's Second New Army and was composed entirely of service battalions from light infantry and rifle regiments. The brigade was assigned to the 20th (Light) Division. The brigade saw service in the trenches of the Western Front with the division throughout the war.

Harry Patch, later to become the last surviving combat veteran of the trenches, served with the 61st Brigade in 1917 when he was just 19 years old with the 7th (Service) Battalion, Duke of Cornwall's Light Infantry in the Battle of Passchendaele (also known as the Third Battle of Ypres) where he was wounded by shrapnel in September. He would survive both world wars and lived until 2009 when he died, on 25 July, at the age of 111.

Order of battle
61st Brigade was constituted as follows during the war:
 7th (Service) Battalion, Somerset Light Infantry
 7th (Service) Battalion, Duke of Cornwall's Light Infantry
 7th (Service) Battalion, King's Own Yorkshire Light Infantry (disbanded February 20, 1918)
 11th (Service) Battalion, Durham Light Infantry (left January 1915, became divisional pioneers)
 12th (Service) Battalion, King's Regiment (Liverpool) (from January 1915)
 61st Machine Gun Company, Machine Gun Corps (formed 3 March 1916, moved to 20th Battalion, Machine Gun Corps 15 March 1918)
 61st Trench Mortar Battery (formed 16 July 1916)

Second World War

The brigade number was reactivated again during the Second World War, now as the 61st (Lorried) Infantry Brigade, in Italy on 21 May 1944. The brigade comprised three battalions of the Rifle Brigade (Prince Consort's Own), the 2nd, 7th and 10th, the former being of the Regular Army and the latter two of the Territorial Army (TA). From May 1944 to August 1945 the brigade was part of the 6th Armoured Division, itself part of the British Eighth Army and fought in the Italian Campaign. It fought in the Liri Valley, Arezzo, the advance to Florence, on the Gothic Line and the Argenta Gap and the Spring 1945 offensive in Italy, Operation Grapeshot.

Order of battle
The 61st Infantry Brigade was constituted as follows during the war:
 2nd Battalion, Rifle Brigade (Prince Consort's Own)
 7th Battalion, Rifle Brigade (Prince Consort's Own)
 10th Battalion, Rifle Brigade (Prince Consort's Own)
 1st Battalion, King's Royal Rifle Corps (from 6 March to 22 July 1945)
 1st Battalion, Welch Regiment (from 29 June 1945)
 2nd Battalion, Queen's Own Cameron Highlanders (from 19 July 1945)
 1st Battalion, Royal Sussex Regiment (from 19 July 1945)

Commanders
The following officers commanded the brigade:

First World War
 18 September 1914: Brig.-Gen. O'Donnel Colley Grattan
 6 July 1915: Brig.-Gen. Charles Ross
 13 November 1915: Brig.-Gen. William Frederick Sweny (wounded, 2 June 1916)
 3 June 1916: Lt.-Col. Clarence John Hobkirk (acting)
 19 July 1916: Brig.-Gen. W. F. Sweny (sick, 24 July 1916)
 27 July 1916: Brig.-Gen. Walter Edward Banbury
 12 March 1918 – 27 March 1919: Brig.-Gen. James Kilvington Cochrane

Second World War
 21 May 1944 – 25 May 1944: Lt. Col. D. Darling
 25 May 1944 – 11 January 1945: Brig. Clements Gore
 11 January 1945 – 5 February 1945: Lt. Col. Richard Fyffe
 5 February 1945 – 27 July 1945: Brig. Adrian Clements Gore]

Recipients of the Victoria Cross
 Private Wilfred Edwards, 7th (Service) Battalion, King's Own Yorkshire Light Infantry, Great War
 Serjeant David Jones, 12th (Service) Battalion, King's Regiment (Liverpool), Great War

References

Infantry brigades of the British Army in World War I
Infantry brigades of the British Army in World War II